Nicrophorus insularis is a burying beetle described by A.H. Grouvelle in 1893.

References

Silphidae
Beetles of North America
Beetles described in 1893